Desert One is an 2019 American documentary film directed and produced by Barbara Kopple. It follows Operation Eagle Claw, a mission that was an attempt to end the Iran hostage crisis by rescuing 52 embassy staff held hostage.

The film had its world premiere at the Toronto International Film Festival on September 8, 2019. It was released on August 21, 2020, by Greenwich Entertainment.

Synopsis
The film follows Operation Eagle Claw, a mission that was an attempt to end the Iran hostage crisis by rescuing 52 embassy staff held hostage at the Embassy of the United States, Tehran. Former U.S. President Jimmy Carter, Walter Mondale, Ted Koppel, David Aaron, Mahmoud Abedini, Robert Gates, Wade Ishimoto, John Limbert, and former hostage-takers and hostages appear in the film.

Release
The film had its world premiere at the Toronto International Film Festival on September 8, 2019. It also screened at DOC NYC on November 8, 2019, and the AFI Fest on November 18, 2019. In April 2020, Greenwich Entertainment acquired U.S. distribution rights to the film. It was released on August 21, 2020.

Reception

Desert One received positive reviews from film critics. The site's critical consensus reads, "Comprehensive without getting bogged down in details, Desert One offers a fascinating look at a daring military mission that ended in defeat." On Metacritic, the film holds a rating of 80 out of 100, based on 13 critics, indicating "generally favorable reviews".

References

External links
 
 
 
 

2019 films
2019 documentary films
American documentary films
Documentary films about war
Documentary films about war crimes
Documentary films about Iran
Documentary films about United States history
Documentary films about veterans
Films directed by Barbara Kopple
2010s American films